Six-Gun Shootout (shown on the title screen as Sixgun Shootout) is a 1985 video game written by Jeff Johnson for the Atari 8-bit family and published by Strategic Simulations.

Gameplay
Six-Gun Shootout is a game in which man-to-man combat is simulated in ten scenarios set in the Wild West.

Reception
Johnny Wilson reviewed the game for Computer Gaming World, and stated that "SG is an relatively simple, fast-moving and enjoyable game. It is satisfying and clear-cut in its determination of victory points and victory."

Reviews
Computer Gaming World - Oct, 1990
Computer Play

References

External links
Review in Antic
Review in Commodore Power/Play
Review in Compute!'s Gazette
Review in Tilt (French)
Review in II Computing
Review in Happy Computer (German)

1985 video games
Apple II games
Atari 8-bit family games
Commodore 64 games
Strategic Simulations games
Turn-based strategy video games
Video games developed in the United States
Video games set in the United States
Western (genre) video games